Chorfah Tor.Sangtiennoi (ช่อฟ้า ท.แสงเทียนน้อย) is a Thai Muay Thai fighter.

Titles and accomplishments
Rajadamnern Stadium 
 2018 Rajadamnern Stadium Fight of the Year (vs Rodtang Jitmuangnon)
 2022 Rajadamnern Stadium Fight of the Year (vs Petchdam Petchyindee Academy)
Muay Thai Nai Khanomtom Association
 2021 Muay Thai Nai Khanomtom Lightweight Champion

Fight record

|-  style="background:#;"
| 2023-03-24 || ||align=left| Sherzod Kabutov || ONE Friday Fights 10, Lumpinee Stadium || Bangkok, Thailand|| || || 
|-  style="background:#fbb;"
| 2023-02-03 || Loss||align=left| Phetsukumvit Boybangna || ONE Friday Fights 3, Lumpinee Stadium || Bangkok, Thailand|| Decision (Unanimous)|| 3||3:00 
|-  style="background:#fbb;"
| 2022-12-03 || Loss ||align=left| Tagir Khalilov ||  ONE 164: Pacio vs. Brooks ||  Manila, Philippines|| TKO (Uppercut) || 1||2:30

|-  style="background:#cfc;"
| 2022-09-18|| Win ||align=left| Kompatak Or.Atchariya||  Suek Muay Thai Witee Tin Thai Muang Nam Dam || Kalasin province, Thailand ||Decision (Split)|| 5||3:00
|-  style="background:#c5d2ea;"
| 2022-08-25 || Draw||align=left| Petchdam Petchyindee Academy ||Petchyindee, Rajadamnern Stadium || Bangkok, Thailand || Decision || 5 ||3:00
|-  style="background:#fbb;"
| 2022-06-12 || Loss||align=left| Nabil VenumMuayThai ||Muaydee VitheeThai + Jitmuangnon, Or.Tor.Gor3 Stadium || Nonthaburi province, Thailand || Decision || 5 ||3:00
|-  style="background:#cfc;"
| 2022-05-12 || Win ||align=left| Samingdet Nor.Anuwatgym ||Petchyindee, Rajadamnern Stadium || Bangkok, Thailand || Decision || 5 ||3:00
|-  style="background:#fbb;"
| 2022-03-25|| Loss ||align=left| Kompatak Or.Atchariya|| Muaymanwansuk, Rangsit Stadium || Bangkok, Thailand || Decision||  5||3:00
|-  style="background:#cfc;"
| 2022-02-17|| Win ||align=left| Nabil VenumMuayThai|| Petchyindee, Rajadamnern Stadium || Bangkok, Thailand || Decision || 5 || 3:00 
|-  style="background:#cfc;"
| 2021-12-23|| Win ||align=left| Fonpanlan SorJor.OleyYasothon || Petchyindee + Nai Khanomtom International Championship || Ayutthaya Province, Thailand || Decision || 5 || 3:00
|-
! style=background:white colspan=9 |
|-  style="background:#fbb;"
| 2021-11-26|| Loss ||align=left| Kompatak SinbiMuayThai || Muay Thai Moradok Kon Thai + Rajadamnern Super Fight || Buriram, Thailand || Decision || 5 || 3:00

|-  style="background:#fbb;"
| 2021-10-16|| Loss ||align=left| Duangsompong Jitmuangnon || Muaydee VitheeThai, OrTorGor.3 Stadium || Nonthaburi Province, Thailand || Decision || 5 || 3:00
|-  style="background:#cfc;"
| 2021-04-09|| Win ||align=left| Mongkolpetch Petchyindee Academy || Petchyindee Road Show || Songkhla, Thailand || Decision || 5 || 3:00
|-  style="background:#cfc;"
| 2021-02-28|| Win||align=left| Prajanban SorJor.Vichitmuangpadriew  ||  Muaydee VitheeThai, Blue Arena || Samut Prakan, Thailand || KO (Knees)||4 ||
|-  style="background:#cfc;"
| 2020-11-07|| Win||align=left| Luknimit Singklongsi  ||  SAT Heroes Series, World Siam Stadium || Bangkok, Thailand || KO (Elbow)||3 ||
|-  style="background:#fbb;"
| 2020-09-26|| Loss||align=left| Yodkhuntap SorGor.SuNgaigym || Onesongchai, Thanakorn Stadium || Nakhon Pathom, Thailand || Decision || 5 || 3:00
|-
! style=background:white colspan=9 |
|-  style="background:#cfc;"
| 2020-09-03|| Win||align=left| Kiewpayak Jitmuangnon || Rajadamnern Stadium || Bangkok, Thailand || KO (Right cross) || 3 ||
|-  style="background:#cfc;"
| 2020-08-12|| Win||align=left| Duangsompong Jitmuangnon || Rajadamnern Stadium  || Bangkok, Thailand || TKO (Referee Stoppage) || 4 ||
|-  style="background:#cfc;"
| 2020-02-27|| Win||align=left| Prajanban SorJor.Vichitmuangpadriew || Rajadamnern Stadium  || Bangkok, Thailand || KO (Right elbow) || 4 ||
|-  style="background:#fbb;"
| 2020-01-31|| Loss ||align=left| Chalam Parunchai || Phuket Super Fight Real MuayThai || Phuket Province, Thailand || Decision || 5 || 3:00
|-  style="background:#fbb;"
| 2020-01-08|| Loss||align=left| Ployvitaya Moosaphanmai || Rajadamnern Stadium  || Bangkok, Thailand || Decision || 5 || 3:00
|-  style="background:#fbb;"
| 2019-09-28|| Loss||align=left| Lamnamoonlek Tded99|| Yodmuay Onesongchai, Royal Thai Air Force Sports Stadium  || Pathum Thani, Thailand || Decision || 5 || 3:00
|-
! style=background:white colspan=9 |
|-  style="background:#cfc;"
| 2019-08-29|| Win||align=left| Yodkhuntap SorGor.SuNgaigym ||  Rajadamnern Stadium || Bangkok, Thailand || TKO (Low kick) || 4 ||
|-  style="background:#cfc;"
| 2019-07-01|| Win||align=left| Apiwat Sor.Somnuek ||  Rajadamnern Stadium || Bangkok, Thailand || Decision || 5 || 3:00
|-  style="background:#fbb;"
| 2019-05-11|| Loss||align=left| Yodkhuntap SorGor.SuNgaigym ||  Rajadamnern Stadium || Bangkok, Thailand || Decision || 5 || 3:00
|-  style="background:#cfc;"
| 2019-03-28|| Win||align=left| Yodkhuntap SorGor.SuNgaigym ||  Rajadamnern Stadium || Bangkok, Thailand || Decision || 5 || 3:00
|-  style="background:#fbb;"
| 2019-03-07|| Loss||align=left| Rodtang Jitmuangnon || Rajadamnern Stadium  || Bangkok, Thailand || Decision || 5 || 3:00
|-  style="background:#cfc;"
| 2019-01-24|| Win||align=left| Dechsakda Phukongyadsuebudomsuk  ||  Rajadamnern Stadium || Bangkok, Thailand || Decision || 5 || 3:00
|-  style="background:#cfc;"
| 2018-12-06|| Win||align=left| Kiewpayak Jitmuangnon || Rajadamnern Stadium || Bangkok, Thailand || KO (Right cross) || 3 ||
|-  style="background:#cfc;"
| 2018-10-12|| Win||align=left| Arthur Meyer || All Star Muay Thai || Aubervilliers, France || Decision || 5|| 3:00
|-  style="background:#fbb;"
| 2018-08-30|| Loss||align=left| Rodtang Jitmuangnon || Rajadamnern Stadium  || Bangkok, Thailand || Decision || 5 || 3:00
|-  style="background:#cfc;"
| 2018-08-06|| Win||align=left| Luknimit Singklongsi  ||  Rajadamnern Stadium || Bangkok, Thailand || Decision || 5 || 3:00
|-  style="background:#cfc;"
| 2018-05-03|| Win||align=left| Yassine Hamlaoui || MFC 7 || France || KO|| 2 ||
|-  style="background:#cfc;"
| 2018-04-02|| Win||align=left| Luknimit Singklongsi  ||  Rajadamnern Stadium || Bangkok, Thailand || Decision || 5 || 3:00
|-  style="background:#cfc;"
| 2018-03-08|| Win||align=left| Morakot Konsaimai|| Rajadamnern Stadium  || Bangkok, Thailand || KO || 3 ||
|-  style="background:#c5d2ea;"
| 2018-02-14|| Draw||align=left| Luknimit Singklongsi  ||  Rajadamnern Stadium || Bangkok, Thailand || Decision || 5 || 3:00
|-  style="background:#fbb;"
| 2018-01-12|| Loss||align=left| Lamnamoonlek Tded99|| Lumpinee Stadium  || Bangkok, Thailand || Decision || 5 || 3:00
|-  style="background:#cfc;"
| 2017-11-02|| Win||align=left| Ployvitaya Moosaphanmai || Rajadamnern Stadium  || Bangkok, Thailand || Decision || 5 || 3:00
|-  style="background:#fbb;"
| 2017-09-09|| Loss||align=left| Ployvitaya Moosaphanmai || Samui Fight || Ko Samui, Thailand || Decision || 5 || 3:00
|-  style="background:#fbb;"
| 2017-08-11|| Loss||align=left| Yamin PK.Saenchaimuaythaigym || Lumpinee Stadium || Bangkok, Thailand || Decision || 5 || 3:00
|-  style="background:#c5d2ea;"
| 2017-06-26|| Draw||align=left| Kongdanai Sor.Sommai || Rajadamnern Stadium || Bangkok, Thailand || Decision || 5 || 3:00
|-  style="background:#fbb;"
| 2017-06-01|| Loss||align=left| Chai Sor.Jor.Toypedriew || Rajadamnern Stadium || Bangkok, Thailand || Decision || 5 || 3:00
|-  style="background:#fbb;"
| 2017-05-03|| Loss||align=left| Khanongsuk Kor.Kampanat || Rajadamnern Stadium || Bangkok, Thailand || Decision || 5 || 3:00
|-  style="background:#cfc;"
| 2017-03-30|| Win||align=left| Luknimit Singklongsi  ||  Rajadamnern Stadium || Bangkok, Thailand || Decision || 5 || 3:00
|-  style="background:#cfc;"
| 2017-01-12|| Win||align=left| Luknimit Singklongsi  ||  Rajadamnern Stadium || Bangkok, Thailand || Decision || 5 || 3:00
|-  style="background:#cfc;"
| 2016-06-11|| Win ||align=left| Chalamsuk Nitisamui || Montri Studio || Bangkok, Thailand || Decision || 5 || 3:00
|-  style="background:#fbb;"
| 2016-01-30|| Loss ||align=left| Pakkalek Tor.Laksong || Montri Studio || Bangkok, Thailand || Decision || 5 || 3:00
|-  style="background:#fbb;"
| 2015-12-23|| Loss ||align=left| Phetlamsin Chor.Hapayak || Rajadamnern Stadium  || Bangkok, Thailand || Decision || 5 || 3:00
|-  style="background:#cfc;"
| 2015-11-19|| Win ||align=left| Pakkalek Tor.Laksong || Rajadamnern Stadium || Bangkok, Thailand || Decision || 5 || 3:00
|-  style="background:#fbb;"
| 2015-11-07|| Loss||align=left| Senwongchai JSP  ||  OneSongchai, Rajadamnern Stadium || Bangkok, Thailand || Decision || 5 || 3:00
|-  style="background:#cfc;"
| 2015-10-14|| Win||align=left| Luknimit Singklongsi  ||  OneSongchai, Rajadamnern Stadium || Bangkok, Thailand || Decision || 5 || 3:00
|-  style="background:#fbb;"
| 2015-09-12|| Loss ||align=left| Phetlamsin Chor.Hapayak || Montri Studio || Bangkok, Thailand || Decision || 5 || 3:00
|-  style="background:#cfc;"
| 2015-08-10|| Win||align=left| Khunsuek Aikbangsai || Rajadamnern Stadium || Bangkok, Thailand || KO || 3 ||
|-  style="background:#cfc;"
| 2015-07-09|| Win||align=left| Khanongsuk Kor.Kampanat || Rajadamnern Stadium || Bangkok, Thailand || Decision || 5 || 3:00
|-  style="background:#fbb;"
| 2015-05-28|| Loss||align=left| Prajanchai P.K.Saenchaimuaythaigym || Rajadamnern Stadium || Bangkok, Thailand || Decision || 5 || 3:00
|-  style="background:#fbb;"
| 2015-05-07|| Loss||align=left| Senwongchai JSP || Rajadamnern Stadium || Bangkok, Thailand || Decision || 5 || 3:00
|-  style="background:#c5d2ea;"
| 2015-03-30|| Draw||align=left| Prajanchai P.K.Saenchaimuaythaigym  || Rajadamnern Stadium || Bangkok, Thailand || Decision || 5 || 3:00
|-  style="background:#cfc;"
| 2015-02-02|| Win||align=left| Fonpad Chuwattana || Rajadamnern Stadium || Bangkok, Thailand || KO  || 3 ||
|-  style="background:#cfc;"
| 2015-01-08|| Win||align=left| Chatchainoi Sitbenjama || Rajadamnern Stadium || Bangkok, Thailand || Decision || 5 || 3:00
|-  style="background:#fbb;"
| 2014-09-24|| Loss ||align=left| Phetlamsin Chor.Hapayak || Rajadamnern Stadium || Bangkok, Thailand || Decision || 5 || 3:00
|-  style="background:#fbb;"
| 2014-08-14|| Loss ||align=left| Prajanchai P.K.Saenchaimuaythaigym || Rajadamnern Stadium || Bangkok, Thailand || Decision || 5 || 3:00
|-  style="background:#fbb;"
| 2014-07-16|| Loss ||align=left| Luknimit Singklongsi  ||  Rajadamnern Stadium || Bangkok, Thailand || Decision || 5 || 3:00
|-  style="background:#c5d2ea;"
| 2014-06-25|| Draw||align=left| Luknimit Singklongsi  ||  Rajadamnern Stadium || Bangkok, Thailand || Decision || 5 || 3:00
|-  style="background:#cfc;"
| 2014-03-05|| Win||align=left| Naka Kaewsamrit || OneSongChai || Nakhon Ratchasima, Thailand || TKO (Doctor Stop) || 2 ||
|-  style="background:#cfc;"
| 2014-01-24|| Win||align=left| Wanchana Or Boonchuay || Lumpinee Stadium || Bangkok, Thailand || Decision || 5 || 3:00
|-  style="background:#c5d2ea;"
| 2014-01-03|| Draw||align=left| Wanchana Or Boonchuay || Lumpinee Stadium || Bangkok, Thailand || Decision || 5 || 3:00
|-  style="background:#c5d2ea;"
| 2013-11-18|| Draw||align=left| Wanchana Or Boonchuay || Lumpinee Stadium || Bangkok, Thailand || Decision || 5 || 3:00
|-  style="background:#fbb;"
| 2013-08-05|| Loss||align=left| Suakim Sit Sor.Tor.Taew || Lumpinee Stadium || Bangkok, Thailand || KO (Right Elbow) || 4 ||
|-  style="background:#cfc;"
| 2013-06-03|| Win||align=left| Lamnampong Noomjeantawana || Rajadamnern Stadium || Bangkok, Thailand || Decision || 5 || 3:00
|-  style="background:#fbb;"
| 2013-04-25|| Loss||align=left| Chankrit Ekbangsai  || Rajadamnern Stadium || Bangkok, Thailand || Decision || 5 || 3:00
|-  style="background:#cfc;"
| 2013-02-21|| Win||align=left| Kaewkla Kaewsamrit || Rajadamnern Stadium || Bangkok, Thailand || Decision || 5 || 3:00
|-  style="background:#cfc;"
| 2013-01-04|| Win||align=left| Petlukyod Sor Sitichai || Rajadamnern Stadium || Bangkok, Thailand || KO (Knees) || 3 || 
|-
| colspan=9 | Legend:

References

Chorfah Tor.Sangtiennoi
Chorfah Tor.Sangtiennoi
Living people
1993 births
Chorfah Tor.Sangtiennoi